Daniel Gregg Santiago (born June 24, 1976) is a Puerto Rican basketball coach in the IMG Academy and former professional basketball player. A center, he had a collegiate career in the NCAA and NAIA. His professional career saw him play in the NBA, the Baloncesto Superior Nacional of Puerto Rico, and overseas. Santiago has played for the Puerto Rican national team since 1998 until 2014, including been part of the 2004 team that defeated the United States at the 2004 Olympic Games in Greece.

College career
Santiago attended and played Junior College basketball at New Mexico Military Institute in Roswell, New Mexico and played NCAA Division I basketball at the University of New Mexico. He finished up his collegiate career at the NAIA school of Saint Vincent College in Latrobe, Pennsylvania, where he was named NAIA player of the year. In 2019 Daniel Santiago obtained a college degree in General Studies with concentrations in Social Work, Sociology and History from the University of South Florida.

Professional career
In Puerto Rico, Santiago played professionally on the National Superior Basketball League with the Vaqueros, helping the team to various national championships and tournament finals.

Between 1998 and 2000, he played for Varese Roosters of the Italian Serie A.

From 2000 to 2001 he played for the NBA's Phoenix Suns as a back-up center until being released.
He returned to the NBA in 2003, playing two seasons with the Milwaukee Bucks.

In 2005, Santiago signed for a season with Spanish ACB League's Unicaja Málaga. After winning the 2006 league, he signed a further two-year deal with the Andalusia outfit. In 2008, Santiago signed with Regal FC Barcelona, helping the side to a third finish in the 2008–09 Euroleague.

In July 2009, Santiago came back to the BSN after a 7-year absence, joining the Bayamón Cowboys. In September 2009 he signed with Efes Pilsen S.K. of Turkey. In October 2010 he signed with Spirou Charleroi. In January 2011 he joined Capitanes de Arecibo.

In September 2012, Santiago signed with Boca Juniors in Argentina. In March 2013, he was selected as the league's best center for the season. In May 2013, he joined the Mets de Guaynabo in Puerto Rico.

National team career
In 2002, Santiago represented senior the Puerto Rican national team at the Indianapolis 2002 FIBA World Cup, and he also played inm the 2004 Summer Olympics team that handed the United States their first defeat in Olympic play, since they began using NBA players. Santiago again represented Puerto Rico at the 2006 World Cup. He retired from the national side in 2007, only to return the following year.

Personal
Santiago's paternal grandfather, Pedro Santiago Rodríguez, was a well known baseball player in Puerto Rico and emigrated to the United States to play. Due to his small stature he was nicknamed "Jockey", while grandson Daniel received the "El Gigante" (the giant) moniker. Puerto Rico's Jockey Rodríguez retired from baseball with the Albuquerque Dukes team under the name Pedro Santiago.

Santiago was raised in the West Texas area of Lamesa on a cotton farm and later in Albuquerque, New Mexico where his parents, Stan and Diana Santiago, originated. He has two younger brothers, Matthew and Jarrett Santiago.

Career stats
Santiago's NBA stats in 122 games were: 417 points (3.4 per game), 260 rebounds (2.1 per game), 38 assists (0.3 per game), 39 steals (0.3 per game) and 47 blocks (0.4 per game). He shot a .469 field goal percentage, and a .685 free throw percentage.

Domestic leagues

See also 

 List of Puerto Ricans
 Puerto Rico Men's National Basketball Team
 Puerto Rico at the 2004 Summer Olympics
 José "Piculín" Ortiz
 Elías Larry Ayuso
 Carlos Arroyo

References

External links
 Statistics in BSN
 Video Interview @ FIBA.com
 NBA.com Profile 
 NBA Stats @ Basketball-Reference.com
 ACB.com profile
 Euroleague Profile

1976 births
Living people
1998 FIBA World Championship players
2002 FIBA World Championship players
2006 FIBA World Championship players
2010 FIBA World Championship players
2014 FIBA Basketball World Cup players
American expatriate basketball people in Argentina
American expatriate basketball people in Belgium
American expatriate basketball people in Italy
American expatriate basketball people in Spain
American expatriate basketball people in Turkey
American men's basketball players
Anadolu Efes S.K. players
Baloncesto Málaga players
Baloncesto Superior Nacional players
Basketball players at the 1996 Summer Olympics
Basketball players at the 1999 Pan American Games
Basketball players at the 2003 Pan American Games
Basketball players at the 2004 Summer Olympics
Basketball players at the 2011 Pan American Games
Basketball players from Texas
Boca Juniors basketball players
Cangrejeros de Santurce basketball players
Capitanes de Arecibo players
Centers (basketball)
FC Barcelona Bàsquet players
Junior college men's basketball players in the United States
Liga ACB players
Medalists at the 2011 Pan American Games
Milwaukee Bucks players
New Mexico Lobos men's basketball players
Olympic basketball players of Puerto Rico
Pallacanestro Varese players
Pallacanestro Virtus Roma players
Pan American Games gold medalists for Puerto Rico
Pan American Games medalists in basketball
Phoenix Suns players
Puerto Rican expatriate basketball people in Spain
Puerto Rican men's basketball players
Puerto Rico men's national basketball team players
Saint Vincent College alumni
Spirou Charleroi players
Sportspeople from Lubbock, Texas
Undrafted National Basketball Association players